Cokum is a locality in the 'Mallee' Ward of the Shire of Buloke, Victoria, Australia.

References